Labit is a surname. Notable people with the surname include:

Christian Labit (born 1971), French rugby union player
Laurent Labit (born 1973), French rugby union player

See also
Labib